The action off Cape Bougaroun (Cap Bougaroûn), or the Attack on Convoy KMF-25A was a Luftwaffe action against an Allied naval convoy off the coast of Algeria during World War II. The convoy of American, British, Greek and Dutch ships was attacked on 6 November 1943 by 25 German land-based aircraft. Six Allied vessels were sunk or damaged and six German aircraft were destroyed. German forces achieved a tactical victory, though the Allied warships involved received credit for defending their convoy and reacting to their losses quickly. The quick response led to the rescue of over 6,000 servicemen and civilians without further loss of life.

Background
Convoy KMF-25A consisted of 26 transports escorted by 15 warships. It sailed from Liverpool to Naples. The 26 transports carried roughly 28,000 American, British and Canadian soldiers as well as war supplies and nurses. Most, if not all of the vessels were armed with small naval and anti-aircraft guns; the American and Dutch ships had armed guards aboard who manned the weapons. The convoy was designated Task Group 60.2 and was under the command of United States Navy Captain Charles C. Hartman in his flagship . Task Group 60.2 included the British light cruiser  and the destroyers USS Mervine,  and HMS Haydon with two other  vessels.

On 27 October 1943, convoy KMF-25A left Great Britain for Egypt and ultimately to Italy. After passing Gibraltar, the ships received air support from the Royal Air Force, but these aircraft squadrons could only help so much as each was constantly being rotated out with another. The rotation left the convoy without support for several minutes at a time while the Royal Air Force sent new planes. It was during one of these periods that a force of nine Luftwaffe torpedo planes and 16 bombers intercepted the convoy.

Action
The convoy sailed in columns of seven to nine ships each from Mers-El-Kebir to Naples. USS Laub was alone and  ahead of the fleet to provide a radar screen. USS Mervine led the warships in a circular course around the three columns. Beatty and Tillman were astern in the rear and Mervine was  ahead. Laubs commander radioed Captain Hartman who signalled the destroyers to make smoke and prepare for action. The thousands of soldiers and civilians were also ordered to go below deck and remain there until the threat was over.

German forces included Heinkel He 111s with F5B torpedoes, Dornier Do 217s with Henschel Hs 293 glide bombs and Junkers Ju 88s. First, the Americans sent out friend or foe signals to the approaching enemy, but when one of the aircraft was identified as German, Hartman was informed and he ordered the escorts to open fire. As the German planes came within range, both the escorts and the transports opened fire toward the sky with a massive hail of machine gun, anti-aircraft and naval gunfire. Seconds later, the Germans began firing their missiles and launching torpedoes. The battle last under 30 minutes but in that time thousands of pounds of ordnance were expended. USS Beatty, under Commander William Outerson, first observed machine gun fire at 18:03 and picked up five incoming planes followed by a bomb explosion at 18:04.

Most of the attacking aircraft seemed to be after Tillman, but she avoided being hit due to her captain who expertly steered his ship through the bombing. Though Tillman escaped being hit, concussion damaged the destroyer's fire-control radar and aft plates. At 18:13, one of the German torpedo planes launched a torpedo from 500 yards at Beatty, 30 seconds later, the missile struck the after engine room near frame 124. The explosion blew a relatively small hole in Beatty; 11 men were killed in action, one died later of wounds and a third sailor, Radioman 3rd Class Samuel Poland was blown overboard along with a K-gun and a depth charge. The charge did not explode. One officer and six men were wounded and USS Beatty slowly began to sink. Immediately damage control parties were sent out to patch the torpedo hole and extinguish fires while others jettisoned topside weight, ammunition and even the tow cable among other things. The engine room flooded which put out all electronics aboard. One of the magazines also filled with water which left Beatty listing twelve degrees to port. The destroyer remained afloat for over four hours before her crew abandoned ship at 19:00 and she sank at position 37º10'N, 06º00'E. With her keel damaged, the destroyer broke in half and sank at about 23:00. The wounded were transferred to USS Parker.

, a War Shipping Administration (WSA) allocated Matson ocean liner operated as a troopship, was in the convoy under Captain Elis R. Johanson and armed with 20 millimeter antiaircraft guns. One torpedo bomber came in for an attack on Monterey but her gunners downed the plane before a torpedo could be dropped. The aircraft began to lose altitude and as it passed over Monterey: it struck and tore off some radio equipment. Captain Johanson later received the Merchant Marine Distinguished Service Medal. , a WSA allocated Grace Line liner converted to a troopship, under William C. Renaut, was hit twice and sank hours later at position  while being towed into Philippeville harbour. Santa Elena was carrying 1,848 Canadian troops and 101 nurses. Four crewmen were killed and the American armed guard on board freed several men who were trapped below. Two armed Dutch transports were struck: , with 2,900 troops on board, was heavily damaged but suffered no deaths; Aldegonde initially survived long enough to make it to shore, where she grounded and sank within Philippeville's outer harbour as her commander was trying to beach her. Thousands of soldiers, merchant sailors, and regular navy sailors became stranded in the water. The other damaged Dutch ship was the steamer ; one man was killed but the ship made it to port.

At around 18:30, a German bomber close to SS Almanzora, was hit by concentrated fire form the armed transport, the plane struck abreast of No2 hatch, port side.  A portion of wing landed on the bow, the pilot's log book and other items from the cockpit were later discovered and handed to Military Intelligence at port.

Both of the sunken transports were not heavily damaged but sustained enough to cause a sinking. The Germans dropped dozens of missiles and torpedoes but most of them failed to hit further targets. At least four hits were made on the Allied fleet which destroyed six aircraft in return: an estimated ten German aviators were killed. British and Greek forces sustained no damage or casualties. HMS Colombo steamed ahead of the centre column of ships and provided accurate anti-aircraft fire: she shot down at least one enemy aircraft. USS Davison destroyed one German plane as well. By 18:20, all of the torpedo planes and bombers were out of the convoy's sight and returning to base. Seventeen Americans and Dutchmen were killed and at least nine others were wounded. Captain Hartman reported that the German planes focused on the escorts so they could attack the transports unopposed but because the Allies returned fire accurately, the Germans suffered heavy losses and ultimately only six vessels of 41 were damaged.

Aftermath

Operations to rescue adrift survivors began while bombs were still falling. American destroyers came alongside the damaged transports and helped evacuate the crews while British policy dictated that no survivors were to be rescued until after the fighting had ceased. This protocol proved deadly a few weeks later off Algeria when the same German squadron attacked and sank . Because the British escorts failed to rescue survivors immediately, 1,016 American soldiers drowned with 122 crewmen.

USS Beattys crew was rescued at about 20:00 by Laub and Parker. Meanwhile, four more U.S. Navy destroyers and tugs from Philippeville and Algiers were sent to help. The minesweeper  rescued men from Santa Elena and the destroyer  rescued Radioman Samuel Poland the following morning. Other survivors were saved by Ruyz and Aldegonde before she grounded. While Monterey was picking up survivors, a nurse fell from the netting she was climbing on and a Chinese cook jumped overboard and saved her.

In all, 6,228 people were rescued without further loss of life. During the battle off Cape Bougaroun, one unknown sailor aboard Beatty dropped over the side a message in a bottle. The message read "Our ship is sinking. SOS didn't do any good. Think it's the end. Maybe this message will get to the U.S. some day." In 1944 the bottle was found on the beaches of Maine, meaning it had floated hundreds of miles across both the Mediterranean and the North Atlantic before reaching the U.S.

See also
 Action off Bougainville
 Mediterranean naval engagements during World War I

Notes

References

 Lubeski, Ray, "Linebackers of the Sea", Author House Publishing Bloomingfield, Indiana (2010), pp. 83–85 
 Olver F., Edward, "Cruise Travel Magazine: History of the Great Liners" (1983) pp. 49–50
 
 
 Morison Eliot, Samuel, "History of United States Naval operations in World War II: The Atlantic Battle Won", Little, Brown and Company Inc. (1984), pp. 261–264 
 Roscoe, Theodore, "United States destroyer operations in World War II", United States Naval Institute (1953) pp. 341 

Cape Bougaroun
Maritime incidents in November 1943
Airstrikes
Battle of the Mediterranean
Cape Bougaroun
Naval battles involving Greece
Mediterranean convoys of World War II
Battles and operations of World War II involving Greece
November 1943 events